Carl Johan Bergman (born 14 March 1978) is a former Swedish biathlete. He lives in Lillehammer, Norway with his Norwegian wife, Liv Kjersti Eikeland.

He studies computer science at the Norwegian University of Science and Technology in Trondheim. His mother is called Birgitta, his father is Lennart, and he has a younger sister called Johanna.

In March 2014, Bergman confirmed that he would be retiring from the sport at the end of the 2013–14 season.

World Cup 
Bergman has been competing in the World Cup since 2001–02. During his career he has finished the overall season in 61st (2001–02), 40th (2002–03), 24th (2003–04), 14th (2004–05), and he finished the 2005–06 season in 11th place.

The 2005–06 season was Bergmans best season, he finished 11th in the overall standings, 375 points behind champion Ole Einar Bjørndalen, and 256 behind second place Raphaël Poirée. He was only 33 points behind Michael Greis who was tenth, which would have been disappointing for Bergman as the top ten biathletes have all their travel and accommodation costs covered by the IBU. Bergman came tenth in the sprint standings, 63 points behind Tomasz Sikora. He was eighth in the pursuit standings, 118 points behind Bjørndalen. In the individual standings he came 30th, 110 behind Greis, and in the mass start he was 23rd, 130 points behind Bjørndalen.

Bergman also claimed his first World Cup win in the 2005–06 season, in a sprint race in Kontiolahti, after hitting all ten targets he finished 6.5 seconds ahead of Sikora, and 12.5 seconds ahead of Sven Fischer, who came third. That season he also finished third twice (pursuit and sprint in Pokljuka), fourth once, fifth twice, and sixth once.

Olympics 
Bergman had a disappointing 2006 Winter Olympics. He was selected for all five events, but except for the relay in which Sweden came fourth, he failed to finish inside the top twenty in any of the events. Bergman put it down to having a bad stomach. In the first event, the 20 km individual, Bergman finished 23rd, he hit 17/20 targets, and was 3:07.9 behind winner Michael Greis. In the 10 km sprint, he was 53rd,3:09.9 behind Sven Fischer, even though he hit all ten targets . Bergman decided not to compete in the 12.5 km pursuit. The next event was the relay, Sweden finished fourth, 43.6 second behind Germany, then in the final event, the 15 km mass start, Bergman finished 29th, 3:34.4 behind Greis, hitting 16/20 targets. He also competed in the 2002 Winter Olympics. He took part in the individual (40th), sprint (28th), pursuit (36th), and Sweden came 14th in the relay.

Shooting 
His shooting average has been in the low 80% range for the last few years. In 1999–00 it was only 73%, with an 83% prone average but a 64% standing average. He improved for the next two years averaging 75% in 2000–01 and 87% in 2001–02. But in 2002–03 it was down to 81%, and then 83% in 2003–04. In 2004–05 he averaged 83% again, making him the 24th-best shot on the tour. His average increased again in 2005–06, to 85% (86% prone, 83% standing), after hitting 314/369 targets, making him the 15th-best shot in the World Cup.

Biathlon results
All results are sourced from the International Biathlon Union.

Olympic Games

*Mass start was added as an event in 2006, with the mixed relay being added in 2014.

World Championships
5 medals (1 gold, 2 silver, 2 bronze)

*During Olympic seasons competitions are only held for those events not included in the Olympic program.
**The mixed relay was added as an event in 2005.

Individual victories
3 victories (3 Sp)

*Results are from UIPMB and IBU races which include the Biathlon World Cup, Biathlon World Championships and the Winter Olympic Games.

References

External links

 
 
 Swedish Olympic Committee
 

1978 births
Living people
People from Hagfors Municipality
Swedish male biathletes
Biathletes at the 2002 Winter Olympics
Biathletes at the 2006 Winter Olympics
Biathletes at the 2010 Winter Olympics
Biathletes at the 2014 Winter Olympics
Olympic biathletes of Sweden
Biathlon World Championships medalists
21st-century Swedish people